Malacoctenus zonogaster, the Belted blenny, is a species of labrisomid blenny mainly native to the Galápagos Islands (also scantly present along the Pacific coast from Baja California to Peru). This species can reach a length of  TL.

References

zonogaster
Galápagos Islands coastal fauna
Fish described in 1903
Taxa named by Robert Evans Snodgrass
Taxa named by Edmund Heller